Maula Jatt, is a 1979 Pakistani Punjabi language action, musical film directed by Younis Malik and produced by Sarwar Bhatti. The film is an unofficial sequel to the 1975's Wehshi Jatt, starring Sultan Rahi as Maula Jatt and Mustafa Qureshi as his arch-rival Noori Natt, two of the most iconic characters in Pakistani cinema.  

This movie belongs to a genre which represents the rural culture of Pakistani central Punjab. Its success set the trend of action films being popular in Pakistan and cemented Sultan Rahi as Lollywood's main hero. The film was inspired by Ahmed Nadeem Qasmi's short story "Gandasa" which described the culture of Gujranwala's rural areas. It received positive reviews from critics. An unofficial sequel titled Maula Jatt in London, also directed by the Yunus Malik, was released in 1981.

Plot
The story is set in a village near the town of Mamdal, near Kabirwala. Following the settlement of Maula Jatt's family feud, Maula has renounced violence and is in charge of administering the peace of 25 villages.

A member of the Natt clan, Maakha, chases a girl, who is given protection by Maula's Bhabi Daani. When Maakha refuses to retreat, Maula's friend Moodha beats up Maakha and leaves a scar on his nose. Maula decrees that if Maakha wants to avoid the fate of being killed by his 'Gandasa', he should marry the girl whom he has dishonoured and marry his sister off to her brother. As the girl has no family, so Maula orders Maakha to marry his sister to Moodha. When Makha returns home, his sister Daaro kills him for cowardice. Daaro then goes to kill Maula, but is arrested on the way for Maakha's murder. However she is bailed out by a man who calls her sister, who is actually Maula.

When Noori Natt gets out of jail, he tells the police that he has run out of competition and he wants a worthy opponent. The police direct him to Malik Haaku, whose clan Maula had slaughtered. Haku doesn't tell Noori the name of his old rival and warns him not to get in his way if he ever finds out about him. On returning home, Daaro tells him of Maakha's defeat and Maula's judgement that she should marry Moodha. Noori comes to Maula's village seeking revenge while Maula is away, and breaks Moodha's leg. When Maula returns, he vows to take Noori's leg in return and recovers his Gandasa.

Maula then rides to find Noori and defeats many of Nattt's men. Maula and Noori finally face off but police stop them from killing each other. In the meantime, Noori's brother-in-law Akku Qatil kills many of Maula's villagers in revenge. Finally a judge decrees that both Maula and Noori should be sent back to their villages under house arrest. However, soon both Jatt and Natt are provoked and ride against each other, although by the time they reach each other for a fight both have been shot several times by the police guarding them. In the hospital, Daaro realizes Maula had called her sister.

After Maula and Noori pretend to reconcile, the police lift the blockade from both villages. Immediately, Akku goes to attack Maula's village, but is himself killed. Maula sends Akku's body and other wedding gifts to Daaro, telling them the wedding procession is coming now, and Noori swears revenge on Maula's village.

As the groom's procession sets out for Daaro's village, Noori leads many Natt clansmen to attack the procession. Maula defeats all the Natt men, and then also Noori himself. Just as he is about to deliver the final blow, Daaro, comes to the rescue and requests Maula to spare Noori and considering that Maula had called her his sister. Maula agrees but Noori amputates his own leg so Maula's revenge is completed. The film ends with Daaro agreeing to marry Moodha and their rivalry resolved forever. Maula immediately throws away his Gandasa and makes an impassioned plea to the audience to choose seeking justice over revenge.

Cast
 Sultan Rahi as Maula 
 Mustafa Qureshi as Noori 
 Aasia as Mukkho Jatti
 Kaifee as Moodha Gaadi
 Chakori as Daaro Nattni
 Adeeb as Maakha Natt
 Aliya Begum
 Asad Bukhari as Akku Natt
 Seema as Daani
 Shakeel as Jailor
 Rangeela
 Albela
 Ilyas Kashmiri as Malik Haku
 Khalid Saleem Mota

Legacy
Film Maula Jatt was commercially successful in the 1980s and celebrated its Diamond Jubilee at the cinemas and the box office. Over the years, the movie has been able to attain cult status. It spawned a number of sequels, becoming the first-ever successful unofficial franchise for a Lollywood title. Maula Jat'''s success spawned Maula Jat tey Noorie Nut as well as Maula Jat in London and continues to influence popular culture. It was also remade in Hindi as Jeene Nahi Doonga. Productions such as the 2002 play Jatt and Bond use Maula Jatt as their "inspiration". 

Remake

Bilal Lashari, the director of Waar (2013) expressed interest in directing a remake of Maula Jatt. On the remake, he commented, "My version of Maula Jatt will be a visual epic, with less dialogue and many captivating moments. It will be a dark but stylised take on Pakistan’s original film genre." The Legend of Maula Jatt, set to release in 2019, was delayed to October 2022 due to COVID-19.

Banning of the movie by the government
It is said that this film was banned because of violence, but later this ban was lifted.

Soundtracks
The songs were composed by Master Inayat Hussain. These were sung by some very popular singers: Noor Jehan, Mehnaz, Inayat Hussain Bhatti, Alam Lohar, Shaukat Ali and  Ghulam Ali.

The soundtrack consisted of the following songs:
Nashe diye botlay, na aini att chukk ni... Inayat Hussain Bhatti
Jhanjhar kare teinu pyar we, main mar gayi Mehnaz
Rowe maan te gharoor, ajj hasse majboor  Noor Jehan
Dildar mere pyar kolun bach ke te kithe Noor Jehan
A te wela aap dasse ga, kon maarda ae maidan pehle halle Alam Lohar, Shaukat Ali and others (a Punjabi bhangra song)

Notes

References

Further reading
Ayres, Alyssa. 2009. Speaking Like a State. Language and Nationalism in Pakistan''. Cambridge University Press. (Chapter 5: The case of Punjab, part II: popular culture, pp. 87–104).

External links
 

1979 films
Punjabi-language Pakistani films
Pakistani crime action films
1970s crime action films
Punjabi films remade in other languages
1970s Punjabi-language films
Films about revenge